New Zealand English (NZE) is the dialect of the English language spoken and written by most English-speaking New Zealanders. Its language code in ISO and Internet standards is en-NZ. English is the first language of the majority of the population.

The English language was established in New Zealand by colonists during the 19th century. It is one of "the newest native-speaker variet[ies] of the English language in existence, a variety which has developed and become distinctive only in the last 150 years". The varieties of English that had the biggest influence on the development of New Zealand English were Australian English and Southern England English, with lesser influences from American English, Hiberno-English, Scottish English and the British prestige accent Received Pronunciation (RP). An important source of vocabulary is the Māori language of the indigenous people of New Zealand, whose contribution distinguishes New Zealand English from other varieties.

Non-rhotic New Zealand English is most similar to Australian English in pronunciation, with some key differences.

Dictionaries
The first dictionary with entries documenting New Zealand English was probably the Heinemann New Zealand Dictionary published in 1979. Edited by Harry Orsman (1928–2002), it is a 1,337-page book with information relating to the usage and pronunciation of terms that were widely accepted throughout the English-speaking world, and those peculiar to New Zealand. It includes a one-page list of the approximate date of entry into common parlance of the many terms found in New Zealand English but not elsewhere, such as "haka" (1827), "boohai" (1920), and "bach" (1905). A second edition was published in 1989 with the cover subtitle "The first dictionary of New Zealand English and New Zealand pronunciation". A third edition, edited by Nelson Wattie, was published as The Reed Dictionary of New Zealand English by Reed Publishing in 2001.

The first dictionary fully dedicated to the New Zealand variety of English was The New Zealand Dictionary published by New House Publishers in 1994 and edited by Elizabeth and Harry Orsman. A second edition was published in 1995, edited by Elizabeth Orsman.

In 1997, Oxford University Press produced the Harry Orsman-edited The Dictionary of New Zealand English: A Dictionary of New Zealandisms on Historical Principles, a 981-page book, which it claimed was based on over 40 years of research. This research started with Orsman's 1951 thesis and continued with his editing this dictionary. To assist with and maintain this work, the New Zealand Dictionary Centre was founded in 1997. It has published several more dictionaries of New Zealand English, including The New Zealand Oxford Paperback Dictionary, edited by New Zealand lexicographer Tony Deverson in 1998, culminating in the 1,374-page The New Zealand Oxford Dictionary in 2004, by Tony Deverson and Graeme Kennedy. A second, revised edition of The New Zealand Oxford Paperback Dictionary was published in 2006, this time using standard lexicographical regional markers to identify the New Zealand content, which were absent from the first edition.

Another authoritative work is the Collins English Dictionary, first published in 1979 by HarperCollins, which contains an abundance of well-cited New Zealand words and phrases, drawing from the 650-million-word Bank of English, a British research facility set up at the University of Birmingham in 1980 and funded by Collins publishers. Although this is a British dictionary of International English there has always been a credited New Zealand advisor for the New Zealand content, namely Professor Ian Gordon from 1979 until 2002 and Professor Elizabeth Gordon from the University of Canterbury since 2003. New Zealand-specific dictionaries compiled from the Collins English Dictionary include the Collins New Zealand Concise English Dictionary (1982), Collins New Zealand School Dictionary (1999) and Collins New Zealand Paperback Dictionary (2009).

Australia's Macquarie Dictionary was first published in 1981, and has since become the authority on Australian English. It has always included an abundance of New Zealand words and phrases additional to the mutually shared words and phrases of both countries. Every edition has retained a New Zealand resident advisor for the New Zealand content, the first being Harry Orsman. and the most recent being Victoria University of Wellington lexicographer Laurie Bauer.

A light-hearted look at English as spoken in New Zealand is A Personal Kiwi-Yankee Dictionary, written by the American-born University of Otago psychology lecturer Louis Leland in 1980. This slim volume lists many of the potentially confusing and/or misleading terms for Americans visiting or emigrating to New Zealand. A second edition was published in 1990.

Historical development
From the 1790s, New Zealand was visited by British, French and American whaling, sealing and trading ships. Their crews traded European goods with the indigenous Māori. The first settlers to New Zealand were mainly from Australia, many of them ex-convicts or escaped convicts. Sailors, explorers and traders from Australia and other parts of Europe also settled.

When in 1788 the colony of New South Wales was formed, most of New Zealand was nominally included, but no real legal authority or control was exercised. However, when the New Zealand Company announced in 1839 its plans to establish colonies in New Zealand this and the increased commercial interests of merchants in Sydney and London spurred the British to take stronger action. Captain William Hobson was sent to New Zealand to persuade Māori to cede their sovereignty to the British Crown and on 6 February 1840, Hobson and about forty Māori chiefs signed the Treaty of Waitangi at Waitangi in the Bay of Islands. From this point onward there was considerable European settlement, primarily from England, Wales, Scotland and Ireland; and to a lesser extent the United States, South Africa, and various parts of continental Europe. Some 400,000 settlers came from Britain, of whom 300,000 stayed permanently. Most were young people and 250,000 babies were born. New Zealand ceased to be part of New South Wales and became a British colony on 1 July 1841.

Gold discoveries in Otago (1861) and Westland (1865), caused a worldwide gold rush that more than doubled the population from 71,000 in 1859 to 164,000 in 1863. Between 1864 and 1865, under the New Zealand Settlements Act 1863, 13 ships carrying citizens of England, Ireland and South Africa arrived in New Zealand under the Waikato Immigration Scheme. According to census data from 1871, around half the early settlers were English, a quarter were Irish, a quarter were Scots and 5% were Australian. The European population of New Zealand grew explosively from fewer than 1000 in 1831 to 500,000 by 1881. By 1911 the number of European settlers had reached a million. The settlement of peoples from various foreign countries and the intermingling of the people with the indigenous Māori brought about what would eventually evolve into a "New Zealand accent" and a unique regional English lexicon.

A distinct New Zealand variant of the English language has been recognised since at least 1912, when Frank Arthur Swinnerton described it as a "carefully modulated murmur". From the beginning of the haphazard Australian and European settlements and latter official British migrations, a new dialect began to form by adopting Māori words to describe the different flora and fauna of New Zealand, for which English did not have words of its own.

The New Zealand accent appeared first in towns with mixed populations of immigrants from Australia, England, Ireland, and Scotland. These included the militia towns of the North Island and the gold-mining towns of the South Island. In more homogeneous towns such as those in Otago and Southland, settled mainly by people from Scotland, the New Zealand accent took longer to appear, while the accent was quick to develop in schools starting from the 1890s.

Since the latter 20th century New Zealand society has gradually divested itself of its fundamentally British roots and has adopted influences from all over the world, especially in the early 21st century when New Zealand experienced an increase of non-British immigration which has since brought about a more prominent multi-national society. The Internet, television, movies and popular music have all brought international influences into New Zealand society and the New Zealand lexicon. Americanization of New Zealand society and language has subtly and gradually been taking place since World War II and especially since the 1970s, as has happened also in neighbouring Australia.

Legal status
While both the Māori language and New Zealand Sign Language have official status, as detailed in legislation, this is mostly limited to the right to use these languages in legal proceedings and other limited circumstances. English has no equivalent legal protection, but its widespread use is commonly accepted and generally assumed by common law. Though requiring a completely “English only” workplace, without a justifiable reason, could be seen as discriminatory. In February 2018, Clayton Mitchell MP from New Zealand First led a campaign for English to be recognised as an official language in New Zealand. Justice Minister Amy Adams said "English is a de facto official language by virtue of its widespread use," while Professor Andrew Geddis called Mitchell's bill "legal nonsense".

Phonology

Not all New Zealanders have the same accent, as the level of cultivation (i.e. the closeness to Received Pronunciation) of every speaker's accent differs. An identifiable feature of New Zealand English is its chain shift where the  vowel has moved up to the place of the traditional  vowel, which in turn has moved up towards the traditional  vowel, which in turn is centralised. This makes "bat" sound like "bet", "bet" sound like "bit", and "bit" sound like "but" to foreign ears. General New Zealand English is non-rhotic, however Southland is semi-rhotic due to the accent's Scottish influence.

Vocabulary
New Zealand English has a number of dialectal words and phrases. These are mostly informal terms that are more common in casual speech. Numerous loanwords have been taken from the Māori language or from Australian English.

New Zealand adopted decimal currency in 1967 and the metric system in 1974. Despite this, several imperial measures are still widely encountered and usually understood, such as feet and inches for a person's height, pounds and ounces for an infant's birth weight, and in colloquial terms such as referring to drinks in pints. In the food manufacturing industry in New Zealand both metric and non-metric systems of weight are used and usually understood owing to raw food products being imported from both metric and non-metric countries. However per the December 1976 Weights and Measures Amendment Act, all foodstuffs must be retailed using the metric system. In general, the knowledge of non-metric units is lessening.

The word spud for potato, now common throughout the English-speaking world, is first recorded in New Zealand English.

As with Australian English, but in contrast to most other forms of the language, some speakers of New Zealand English use both the terms bath and bathe as verbs, with bath used as a transitive verb (e.g. I will bath the dog), and bathe used predominantly, but not exclusively, as an intransitive verb (e.g. Did you bathe?).

Both the words amongst and among are used, as in British English. The same is true for two other pairs, whilst and while and amidst and amid.

Australian English influences
New Zealand English terms of Australian origin include bushed (lost or bewildered), chunder (to vomit), drongo (a foolish or stupid person), fossick (to search), larrikin (mischievous person), Maccas (slang for McDonald's food), maimai (a duckshooter's hide; originally a makeshift shelter, from aboriginal mia-mia), paddock (field, or meadow), pom or pommy (an Englishman), skite (verb: to boast), station (for a very large farm), wowser (non-drinker of alcohol, or killjoy), and ute (pickup truck).

American English influences 
Advancing from its British and Australian English origins, New Zealand English has evolved to include many terms of American origin, or which are otherwise used in American English, in preference over the equivalent contemporary British terms. Some examples of such words in New Zealand English are the preferred usage of the American bobby pin over the British hair pin, muffler for silencer, truck for lorry, station wagon for estate car, stove for cooker, creek over brook or stream, eggplant for aubergine, median strip for central reservation, pushup for press-up, and potato chip for potato crisp.

Other examples of vocabulary directly borrowed from American English include the boonies, bucks (dollars), bushwhack (fell timber), butt (bum or arse), ding (dent), dude, duplex, faggot or fag (interchangeable with the British poof and poofter), figure (to think or conclude; consider), hightail it, homeboy, hooker, lagoon, lube (oil change), man (in place of mate or bro in direct address), major (to study or qualify in a subject), to be over [some situation] (be fed up), rig (large truck), sheltered workshop (workplace for disabled persons), spat (a small argument), and subdivision, and tavern. Regarding grammar, since about 2000 the American gotten has been increasingly commonly used as the past participle of "get" instead of the standard British English got.
In a number of instances, terms of British and American origin can be used interchangeably. Additionally, many American borrowings are not unique to New Zealand English, and may be found in other dialects of English, including British English.

New Zealandisms

In addition to word and phrase borrowings from Australian, British and American English, New Zealand has its own unique words and phrases derived entirely in New Zealand, many of which are slang terms. The following list summarises some such words and phrases:
 ... and that (phrase) – a substitution for unnamed other(s), activity(ies), thing(s). e.g. "We had a beer with Darryl and that." "I picked up the tools and that." (also in UK) 
 Aussie (noun) – Australia. This extension of the term to mean the country is unique to New Zealand. In Australia and internationally, Aussie means Australian (person or thing), as opposed to Australia (the country.) The normal adjectival usage is also used in New Zealand
 bach (noun) – cheaply built and basic holiday home; located at beaches throughout the country
boost it/boosting (verb) – to speed or to go fast, derived from the term boost in reference to vehicles (eg turbo-boosting a car)
 big-huge something large, big, or huge as in "there was a big-huge spider crawling down the wall!"
 Carbonettes (noun, especially in the North Island) – pieces of charcoal used in barbecues 
 choice! (interj) – one-word rejoinder expressing satisfaction
 chur (interj) – many uses, the most common being a form of greeting, or a contraction of "cheers" most commonly heard in "chur, bro". It is also used as an alternative to "good on you"
 convert (verb) – to steal a car, hence also the name for car theft being car conversion
 crib (noun) – similar to bach (above), used more in Otago and Southland
 dairy (noun) – corner shop; convenience store
 durry cigarette
 eh? (particle) – used to elicit a response. Used much more in New Zealand than in the stereotypical Canadian English.
 Gib board, Gibraltar board (noun) – the common NZ term for drywall, plasterboard interior wall lining (a genericised trademark; Gib™ is a trademark of Winstone Wallboards Ltd)
 handle (noun) – a 425–500 mL glass of beer with a handle, as sold in pubs
 hardout/hard – used to show agreement, or used to show emphasis/intensity. Examples: Agreement: "Yeah hard/hardout". "He was running hardout."
 heaps (adjective, adverb) – abundant, plenty, plentifully. Examples: "There are heaps of cops surrounding the house." "I love you heaps." "Give it heaps!" – give it your best effort! often in cooking someone would say, "that's heaps" meaning 'that's too much'  (also used in Australia)
 hokey pokey (noun) – the New Zealand term for honeycomb toffee; also a flavour of ice cream consisting of plain vanilla ice cream with small, solid lumps of honeycomb toffee.
 jandals (noun) – the NZ term for flip-flops. Originally a trademarked name derived from "Japanese sandals".
 jug (noun) – a kettle  (also used in Australia)
 kai (noun) – Māori word meaning food, or something to eat, used by Māori and Pākehā alike
 kumara (noun) – sweet potato, specifically those historically cultivated by Māori.
 Kiwi (adj) – Not only does Kiwi mean 'a New Zealand person', but it is sometimes used to replace the name of New Zealand in NZ businesses or titles, such as KiwiRail, Kiwibank and KiwiBuild, or New Zealand-related nouns, e.g. "Kiwi-ism". It is also used to address something that is particularly related to New Zealand, e.g. "that house is pretty kiwi"  (also used in Australia). N.B. Kiwifruit is always called "kiwifruit".
 luncheon sausage (noun) – devon sausage (also called "fritz" or "belgium" in some parts of New Zealand)
 metal road (noun) – a dirt road overlaid with gravel to assist drainage and keep dust down, typically found in rural settings
 puckerood (adj) – broken; busted; wrecked. From Māori "pakaru" – to shatter
 ranchslider, ranch slider, (noun) – a NZ term for a sliding door, usually of aluminium frame and containing glass panels (a genericised trademark; Ranchslider™ is a registered trademark of Fletcher Window & Door Systems).
 rark up (verb) – to criticise, confront or hurry along
 scroggin – a nutritious snack taken along on hikes by trampers
 shingle (noun) – gravel. A shingle road is an un-sealed road
 shot! – (acknowledgement or interj) – "thank you", or used as an expression of joy or to give praise. Can also be used as congratulations or acknowledgement of good work – "Shot for your run time!" Can also be said "Good shot!"
 slab (noun) – a case of twelve to twenty four cans of beer packed together and bought as a whole  (also used in Australia)
 stink (adjective) something bad, unfortunate, undesirable, unfair as in "that's a pretty stink situation."
 sweet as! (interj) – Cool! Awesome! (also in UK and Australia)
 tar seal road (noun) – chipseal road
 tiki tour (noun) – a guided tour; exploration; a meandering route taken in order to waste time
 togs (noun – always the plural form) – a swimming or bathing costume, swimsuit, bikini  (also used in Australia)
 town house (noun) – a small self-contained, free standing house with little or no front or back yard, often with a shared driveway with neighbouring houses. The NZ meaning is unique and differs from the American, Asian, Australian and European meaning of townhouse (typically terraced houses) as well as the older UK meaning (city houses of nobility)  (also used in Australia)
 tramping (noun)  tramp (verb) – Bushwalking, hiking. Usage is exclusive to New Zealand
 up the boohai / up the Puhoi [River] / in the wop wops – to be lost or stranded, of unknown whereabouts or when unwilling to divulge whereabouts. In the outback, or in the boondocks
 whānau – extended family, from grandparents to grandchildren (Māori word, used by New Zealand government: "If the mother is too young, the whānau can help her to take care of her baby")
 whiteware – major kitchen appliances (white goods in UK)

Differences from Australian English
Many of these relate to words used to refer to common items, often based on which major brands become eponyms.

Usage
Some New Zealanders often reply to a question with a statement spoken with a rising intonation at the end. This often has the effect of making their statement sound like another question. There is enough awareness of this that it is seen in exaggerated form in comedy parody of New Zealanders, such as in the 1970s comedy character Lyn Of Tawa. This rising intonation can also be heard at the end of statements that are not in response to a question but to which the speaker wishes to add emphasis. High rising terminals are also heard in Australia.

In informal speech, some New Zealanders use the third person feminine she in place of the third person neuter it as the subject of a sentence, especially when the subject is the first word of the sentence. The most common use of this is in the phrase "She'll be right" meaning either "It will be okay" or "It is close enough to what is required". Similar to Australian English are uses such as "she was great car" or "she's a real beauty, this [object]".

Another specific New Zealand usage is the way in which New Zealanders refer to the country's two main islands. They are always (except on maps) referred to as "the North Island" and "the South Island". And because of their size, New Zealanders tend to think of these two islands as being 'places', rather than 'pieces of land', so the preposition "in" (rather than "on") is usually used – for example, "my mother lives in the North Island", "Christchurch is in the South Island". This is true only for the two main islands; for smaller islands, the usual preposition "on" is used – for example, "on Stewart Island" (the third largest), or "on Waiheke Island" (the third most populous).

Māori influence

Many local everyday words have been borrowed from the Māori language, including words for local flora, fauna, place names and the natural environment.

The dominant influence of Māori on New Zealand English is lexical. A 1999 estimate based on the Wellington corpora of written and spoken New Zealand English put the proportion of words of Māori origin at approximately 0.6%, mostly place and personal names.

Some Māori words occur in New Zealand English, such as kia ora (hello).

Māori is ever present and has a significant conceptual influence in the legislature, government, and community agencies (e.g. health and education), where legislation requires that proceedings and documents be translated into Māori (under certain circumstances, and when requested). Political discussion and analysis of issues of sovereignty, environmental management, health, and social well-being thus rely on Māori at least in part. Māori as a spoken language is particularly important wherever community consultation occurs.

Dialects and accents
Recognisable regional variations are slight, except for Southland and the southern part of neighbouring Otago, with its "Southland burr", where the postvocalic R is pronounced rather than clipped. This southern area traditionally received heavy immigration from Scotland (see Dunedin). Several words and phrases common in Scots or Scottish English persist there; examples include the use of wee for "small", and phrases such as to do the messages meaning "to go shopping". Another feature is the maintaining of the  ~  distinction (e.g. where which and witch are not homophones).

Recent research (2012) suggests that postvocalic  is not restricted to Southland, but is found also in the central North Island where there may be a Pasifika influence, but also a possible influence from modern New Zealand hip‐hop music, which has been shown to have high levels of non‐prevocalic  after the  vowel.

Taranaki has been said to have a minor regional accent, possibly due to the high number of immigrants from the south-west of England. However, this is becoming less pronounced.

Some Māori have an accent distinct from the general New Zealand accent; and also tend to include Māori words more frequently. Comedian Billy T. James and the bro'Town TV programme were notable for featuring exaggerated versions of this. Linguists recognise this as "Māori English", and describe it as strongly influenced by syllable-timed Māori speech patterns. Linguists count "Pākehā English" as the other main accent, and note that it is beginning to adopt similar rhythms, distinguishing it from other stress-timed English accents.

It is commonly held that New Zealand English is spoken very quickly. This idea is given support by a study comparing adult New Zealand English and American English speakers which observed faster speaking and articulation rates among the New Zealand English group overall. However, a similar study with American and New Zealand English-speaking children found the opposite, with the speaking and articulation rates of the New Zealand children being slower. The same study proposed that differences in the relative number of tense and lax vowels between the two speaker groups may have influenced the speaking and articulation rates.

Spelling
 Where there is a difference between British and US spelling (such as cancelling/canceling and jewellery/jewelry), the British spelling of double-L is universally used. The British use of single-L is also universally used in words such as enrol.
New Zealanders use tyres, not tires, except for trademarks such as Cooper Tires.
 The Commonwealth spelling of kerb (at roadside) is used over US curb.
 New Zealand spelling of -re words such as centre, fibre, litre, and theatre has always followed the British spelling as opposed to the American center, fiber, liter, and theater.
 Nouns with the -ce suffix such as defence and licence are usually spelt with -ce as opposed to the American defense and license.
 With -our words like colour/color or favour/favor the spelling of -our is always used unless a Trademark, such as Colorsteel or The Color Run, etc. Foreign official awards such as the FBI Medal Of Valor always retain their US spelling in New Zealand texts. Additionally the online version of The New Zealand Herald newspaper republishes articles with US spelling when the original article is written with US spelling, such as articles from the Associated Press. Since the advent of word processors with spell-checkers, in modern assignment writing in New Zealand universities  the rule is to use either 100% British spelling or 100% American spelling, the emphasis being consistency.
 New Zealand English retains the distinctions between program ("computer heuristic") and programme ("schedule", "broadcast show"), disk ("information storage device") and disc ("flat circular object"), and analog (as in analog stick) and analogue (all other senses) as found in British and often in Australian English.
 It is usual to form past tenses and past participles of certain verbs with -t and not -ed. For example, learn becomes learnt, spoil becomes spoilt, burn becomes burnt, dream becomes dreamt , and smell becomes smelt. These verb forms are pronounced with a final unvoiced  sound, meaning spoilt is pronounced  not . This contrasts with American English, where -ed is far more common and is pronounced  (e.g. dwelled  is an American form of dwelt ). Learned, the adjective meaning "wise", is universally spelt thus and pronounced as two syllables. The past tenses and past participles of earn and boil are earned and boiled respectively, though they may be pronounced ending with a  sound.
 Words with the digraphs ae and oe in British English are usually spelt as such in New Zealand English (e.g. faeces not feces) rather than with just e as with American English. There are some exceptions where certain words are becoming universally spelt with e such as encyclopaedia, chamaeleon, hyaena, and homoeopathy which are now spelt encyclopedia, chameleon, hyena, and homeopathy respectively. This is also occurring in British English in these cases too.
 In hyperbolic statements, the spellings of ton and tons are commonly used (e.g. I have tons of friends and I feel tons better), despite the metric system with its tonne having been introduced in the 1970s.
 In words that may be spelt with either an -ise or an -ize suffix (such as organise/organize) it is acceptable to use either in New Zealand English but -ise has taken precedence over several decades. This contrasts with American and Canadian English, where -ize is generally preferred, and British English, where -ise is also generally preferred. In Australian English -ise is strictly used.
 New Zealand favours fiord over fjord, unlike most other English-speaking countries. The fiord spelling was the normal one in English until the early 1920s, and is preserved in many place names worldwide. In New Zealand it is used in Fiordland, a rugged region in the south-west.
 When spelling words borrowed from Māori, New Zealand English can either spell them with macrons or without (e.g. Maori and Māori are both accepted spellings).
 New Zealand always uses jail over British and Australian gaol.
 Gram, the unit of mass, is commonly spelt as such and not gramme, which is somewhat found in British English. The same holds true for the word's derivates (e.g., kilogram is more common than kilogramme).
 Contractions (i.e. shortened words that retain the final letter of the full word) do not terminate with a full stop. Thus the abbreviation of Doctor is Dr and that of Mister is Mr, as opposed to Dr. and Mr. in American English. Initialisms and acronyms such as USA and NASA (or Nasa) also do not include full stops. This has been the practice in New Zealand since the late 1970s.

See also

 Culture of New Zealand
 Australian English
 South African English
 Zimbabwean English
 Falkland Islands English
 Regional accents of English
Date and time notation in New Zealand

References

Bibliography

 
 
 Cryer, Max (2002). Curious Kiwi Words. Auckland: HarperCollins Publishers (NZ) Ltd.
 
Deverson, Tony, and Graeme Kennedy (eds.) (2005). The New Zealand Oxford Dictionary. Oxford University Press.
 
Grant, L.E., and Devlin, G.A. (eds.) (1999). In other words: A dictionary of expressions used in New Zealand. Palmerston North: Dunmore Press.
Leland, Louis S., jr. (1980). A personal Kiwi-Yankee dictionary. Dunedin: John McIndoe Ltd.
Orsman H.W., (ed.) (1997). The Dictionary of New Zealand English: a dictionary of New Zealandisms on historical principles. Auckland: Oxford University Press. .
Orsman H.W., (ed.) (1979). Heinemann New Zealand dictionary. Auckland: Heinemann Educational Books (NZ) Ltd.

Further reading

External links

 New Zealand Slang
 Origins of New Zealand English
 The Origins of New Zealand English Project at the University of Canterbury
 New Zealand Dictionary Centre
 New Zealand English in the 21st century
 Kiwi Words & Phrases
 New Zild – The Story of New Zealand English
 English, Maori, and Maori English in New Zealand
 The New Zealand Oxford Dictionary
 The Ultimate Traveller's Guide To New Zealand Slang

 
Languages attested from the 19th century
Dialects of English
English
Oceanian dialects of English